August Martinius Oddvar (1 August 1877 – 17 March 1964) was a Norwegian stage actor. He made his stage debut at the National Theatre in 1899, and played there all his career, which spanned sixty years.

He was appointed Knight, First Class of the Royal Norwegian Order of St. Olav in 1939, and Commander in 1956. He was Knight of the Icelandic Order of the Falcon.

References

1877 births
1964 deaths
Norwegian male stage actors
Knights of the Order of the Falcon